The Site C Dam is an under construction hydroelectric dam on the Peace River, 14 kilometres southwest of Fort St. John in northeastern British Columbia, Canada. It is located approximately 80 kilometres downstream from the W. A. C. Bennett Dam. When completed in 2025, the Site C Dam will become the 4th largest producer of hydroelectricity in British Columbia with an expected capacity of 1,100 MW and an expected annual output of 5,100 GWh of electricity.

A publicly accessible viewpoint is located immediately west of the City of Fort St. John, on the south side of Highway 97.

The project has drawn considerable opposition from several quarters due to its planned flooding of agricultural land, damage to the local environment, high construction cost, possible alternatives, and the uncertainty of future electricity prices and demand in the province. Two Treaty 8 First Nations, and local landowners have made legal challenges to the dam, though these were dismissed by the federal Court of Appeal. In addition, over 200 scholars, as well as the Royal Society of Canada, have expressed concerns to the federal Liberal government, citing weakness in the regulatory review process and the environmental assessment for the project. In May 2016 the federal government stated it is "not revisiting projects that have been reviewed and approved". On 11 December 2017, John Horgan, the Premier of British Columbia, announced: "We've come to a conclusion that, although Site C is not the project we would have favoured or would have started, it must be completed," thus guaranteeing the completion of the project.

History
When completed, Site C will be the third of four major dams on the Peace River that were initially proposed in the mid-twentieth century. The first project was the flagship W. A. C. Bennett Dam 19 kilometres west of Hudson's Hope. The Bennett Dam began operation in 1968 and formed Williston Reservoir, which is 95% larger than the Site C reservoir will become. Construction of the Peace Canyon Dam was completed in 1980 at a point 23 km downstream of the W. A. C. Bennett dam. The third dam,"Site C," was also proposed at the time for a site 83 km downriver of the Peace Canyon dam, or approximately 7 km southwest of Fort St. John. Site C would flood an 83 km length of the Peace River valley, widening the river by up to three times, as well as a 10 km length of the Moberly River valley and 14 km of the Halfway River valley. The fourth proposed dam on the British Columbia segment of the Peace River, Site E, near the BC–Alberta border, was removed from the planning process during hearings in 1982.

After hearings between 1981 and 1983, the British Columbia Utilities Commission turned down the Site C project. The commission was critical of BC Hydro's forecasting methods, declaring that it neither explicitly took energy prices into account nor relied on statistically significant past patterns of behaviour. BC Hydro then chose to purchase electricity under long-term contracts from independent power producers, and it continues to do so today. As of 2017 these annual purchases are about four times the capacity of Site C. Once the initial contracts with BC Hydro expire, these independent producers may be free to export their electricity.

In April 2010, passage of the Clean Energy Act exempted the project from further BC Utilities Commission review. Site C was being reconsidered by BC Hydro for two years prior as the utility reconsidered expansion of its dam capacity on the Peace. Also in April 2010, the provincial government announced it would move forward on planning for the project, moving it to the regulatory review phase. The review was mandated under the Canadian Environmental Assessment Act, 2012 (CEAA 2012) and the British Columbia Environmental Assessment Act (BCEAA). To avoid duplication, the governments of Canada and British Columbia set up a cooperative federal-provincial environmental assessment, including a joint review panel (JRP) process.

In October 2014, Site C received environmental assessment approvals from the federal and provincial governments after a three-year environmental review, including a federal/provincial Joint Review Panel process. In December 2014, the provincial government announced a final investment decision, approving the construction of the hydroelectric project at a cost of $8.335 billion, as well as a project reserve of $440 million. A notice of Site C construction commencing in 2015 was issued in July 2015. By March 2016, site clearing, attempts at bank stabilization and the search for bedrock took the majority of BC Hydro's focus - there were no "works" in the ground; the diversion tunnels had not yet been started. BC Premier Christy Clark's stated intention was to get dam construction "to the point of no return" by the time of a scheduled general election in May 2017. The provincial election resulted in the previous Liberal government being defeated and a New Democratic government taking office. The newly elected government requested the BC Utilities Commission 2017 review.

The project has sparked controversy for a number of reasons: First Nations treaty rights are at issue, the dam is thought by many to be economically unviable, and there are concerns about the loss of agriculturally productive land and the overall environmental impact. The federal/provincial Joint Review Panel found that the need for the electricity had not been clearly demonstrated, nor were alternatives to the project evaluated.

Cost

A cost estimate produced during the 2007 feasibility study placed the financial cost at a maximum of C$6.6 billion based on the 1981 design, safety, and engineering standards. An updated cost projection was released in May 2011 placing the estimated cost at $7.9 billion, which was revised to $8.3 billion in 2014.  This does not include the cost of a transmission line to major population centres, estimated to be in the range of $743 million additional, bringing the total estimated cost to approximately $9 billion. At the invitation of the British Columbia Utilities Commission, Deloitte published a report on the project, and noted that it's likely to miss a crucial river diversion deadline; this will bring the cost to just under $10 billion.  In 2015, some experts stated that the costs could reach as high as $11 to 12 billion. In February 2021, the estimated price tag rose once again, reaching $16 billion.

Economic estimates in 2016 by Harry Swain, former chair of the Joint Review Panel and former BC deputy minister of Industry, projected that if all the power were sold to the US spot market, as little as $1.8 billion would be returned, and the rest ($7 billion) of the cost would be covered by taxpayers. Power consumption has not been increasing despite increasing population. Swain also stated that power roughly equivalent to that produced by Site C could be reclaimed from American producers under the Columbia River Treaty at no capital cost to the province; the power is currently sold to American utilities at about half the projected cost of Site C power. British Columbia Utilities Commission has stated that the Canadian entitlement under the treaty, however, is not a suitable source of dependable capacity.

Legality

Members of the Treaty 8 First Nations boycotted the official Site C announcement ceremony at the Bennett Dam in April 2010, and the West Moberly First Nation publicly stated that it was considering legal action to oppose the dam. In April 2016, a group of landowners and farmers from BC's Peace River Valley launched a legal challenge to the project. The landowners' case states that the Provincial government ignored concerns about the project raised by the Joint Review Panel, including its cost, failure to demonstrate the need for the project, and lack of evaluation of alternatives. Also in April 2016, BC Treaty 8 First Nations filed a legal challenge in the Supreme Court of BC. The Peace Valley Landowners’ Association, BC Treaty 8 First Nations, Alberta Treaty 8 First Nations, and Blueberry River First Nation were pursuing actions in federal court.

As of December 2016, five judicial reviews of Site C's environmental approvals have been dismissed. These include two challenges from the Peace Valley Landowner Association in the B.C. Supreme Court and the Federal Court of Appeal, as well as a pair of challenges against the project's federal and provincial environmental approvals from the West Moberly and Prophet River First Nations. On 23 January 2017, the sixth legal challenge was dismissed, involving Treaty 8 First Nations, which was in the federal court.

Scholars' concerns
In May 2016 a group of over 200 Canadian scholars signed a letter raising serious concerns about the process used to approve the Site C dam. The Royal Society of Canada took the "unusual step" of writing a separate supporting letter to Prime Minister Justin Trudeau. The letter from those "concerned scholars" summarized their concerns: "Our assessment is that this process did not accord with the commitments of both the provincial and federal governments to reconciliation with and legal obligations to First Nations, protection of the environment, and evidence-based decision-making with scientific integrity." Scientists argue that the environment impacts of the dam and the lack of First Nations consent make the dam a "'bellwether' of the Trudeau government's commitment to develop resources in a more science-based, sustainable and socially responsible way." The federal government rejected the scholars' call to halt construction. Environment and Climate Change Minister Catherine McKenna's office indicated that the government had no intention to revisit the Site C environmental assessment.

Utilities Commission 2017 review
BC's opposition New Democratic Party promised a review of the project by the BC Utilities Commission (BCUC) should they win the 2017 general election. Hydro critic Adrian Dix called the B.C. Liberal government "reckless" for not having already done the review, as was recommended by the federal-provincial Joint Review Panel led by Harry Swain. 
On 2 August 2017, following a Provincial election, the NDP government requested that the BCUC evaluate the cost to BC Hydro ratepayers of continuing, suspending or terminating construction of the Site C dam. In its Final Report published on 1 November 2019, the BCUC reached two overarching conclusions:

 The cost to ratepayers of suspending construction would be significantly higher than either continuing or terminating the project, to the tune of $3.6 billion. In addition, there are significant risks that it would not be possible to restart the project due to permitting and other issues. 
 The cost to ratepayers of continuing or terminating construction is similar, given the assumptions that the BCUC finds to be most reasonable. Both alternatives also have risks which may cause one or the other to be more costly to ratepayers either in the short-term or over a longer period.

To assist the government in its decision-making, the BCUC included in the Final Report some sensitivity analyses to show how the cost estimates would change if different assumptions were applied.

Following the release of the Final Report the BCUC responded to additional questions from the BC government which clarified that:
 Site C sunk and termination costs were correctly treated in the rate impact analysis (sunk costs were excluded; Site C termination costs were added to the cost of the alternative portfolio); 
 The same financing cost assumption was used for Site C and wind/geothermal investments in order to ensure the review was agnostic regarding ownership structure; 
 Demand-side management costs were included in the alternative portfolio at their cost to the utility, as these would be the costs incurred by BC Hydro;  
 The period used to recover Site C sunk costs from customers if the project was terminated would be subject to BCUC approval. While no determination as to the appropriate period was made, a 30-year period was assumed for the rate impact analysis with sensitivity analysis on 10- and 70-year amortization periods; and 
 The BCUC considered electrification in arriving at its assessment that it would be more appropriate to use BC Hydro’s low load forecast in its economic analysis. The BCUC also considered recent developments in the industrial sectors, accuracy of historical load forecasts, GDP and other forecast drivers, price elasticity assumptions, future rate increases, potential disrupting trends and historical flattening electricity demand.

Agricultural land impacts
Annual flooding has deposited rich sediments along the low bank portions of the Peace River. The creation of the Williston Lake reservoir has improved agricultural use on the former floodplain. Since 1967, the annual spring flood measured at Hudson's Hope has been reduced by two-thirds, along with a reduction in ice jams and ice scouring above the riverbank. The Site C project will result in the largest exclusion of land in the 40-year history of BC's Agricultural Land Reserve (ALR). In all,  of land will be removed from the ALR for the project. The Joint Review Panel accepted BC Hydro's assessment that "production from the Peace River bottom lands is small and is certainly not important in the context of B.C." The Panel's assessment of earning potential in the next several decades led them to conclude: "The highest and best use of the Peace River valley would appear to be as a reservoir."

Professional agrologist Wendy Holm, past president of the B.C. Institute of Agrologists, noted that flooding agricultural land in the Peace River valley is a bad idea, because it is "the only large tract of land for future horticultural expansion in the province."  She notes that much of B.C.'s produce is imported from California, and growing food locally would increase food security for the province.

According to David Suzuki, flooding valuable farmland to build the dam will undermine Canada's international commitments under the Paris Agreement. Suzuki considers the farmland essential to reduce B.C.'s dependence on imported foods and minimize the carbon fuels needed to transport those foods: "It seems to me crazy to put farmland in the north underwater," Suzuki said. "We live in a food chain now in which food grows on average 3,000 kilometres from where it's consumed. The transport of all that food is dependent on fossil fuels. Food has got to be grown much closer to where it's going to be consumed."

Advantages
In April 2015, the federal and provincial governments named a Joint Review Panel to hold a public hearing on Site C.

In addition to a long list of recommended changes, their assessment stated: "Despite high initial costs, and some uncertainty about when the power would be needed, the Project would provide a large and long-term increment of firm energy and capacity at a price that would benefit future generations. It would do this in a way that would produce a vastly smaller burden of greenhouse gases than any alternative save nuclear power, which B.C. has prohibited." At the time the report was released, the panel added, "Site C would be the least expensive of the alternatives, and its cost advantages would increase with the passing decades as inflation makes alternatives more costly."

In reference to the Paris climate accord, Site C is predicted to prevent approximately 30 to 70 million tonnes of carbon dioxide from being generated in the atmosphere.

Ottawa has discussed a new electricity inter-tie to move Site C power between BC and Alberta. Justin Trudeau commented "I think anything we can work together inter-provincially or nationally [to get] emissions down, emphasizing hydroelectricity, creating opportunities to get off coal, to get off natural gas, where possible, is good for the country. It’s good for our emissions profile; it’s good for the economy we need to build,"

Impacts to Indigenous Peoples 

Northeastern BC Indigenous peoples have previously been negatively impacted by other resource development projects, such as the W.A.C. Bennett Dam which is on the same river as Site C. It is feared that the construction of the Site C Dam would result in similar impacts, such as the alteration of Indigenous ways of life, although consultation with Indigenous groups is taking place and measures to mitigate some of the dam's impacts on Indigenous peoples are being taken. The risk of serious harm to the rights of Indigenous peoples requires that large-scale resource development proceed only with their free, prior and informed consent.

First Nations have identified hundreds of sacred sites or areas with cultural or historic significance in the planned Site C flood zone. The Indigenous peoples of the area use the valley to hunt, fish trap, and gather berries as well as conduct ceremonies and harvest wild foods. The valley is a prime habitat for animals that they rely on as a food source, such as moose, bears, and eagles. The dam could also harm an already threatened fish species, the bull trout. The flooding of the valley may poison the fish with methylmercury for 20–30 years.

Resource extraction has led to rapid population growth in the region. As a result of road construction and logging, non-Indigenous fisherman and hunters now have access to dwindling harvests. Just over 110 square km is recognized as reserve lands and this is not enough to sustain First Nations cultures and traditions. Indigenous peoples have ongoing rights to harvest foods and practice their customs throughout their broader territory but because of intensive resource development there is a decreasing amount of places left where this is possible. The Peace River Valley falls within the bounds of Treaty 8, which recognizes First Nations rights to hunt, trap, and fish throughout the region. According to Indigenous activist Helen Knott, if the valley is flooded, then the promise of that treaty will be violated.

Alternatives
BC Hydro achieved savings at $20/MWh, while the estimated savings were at $30/MWh. Columbia Treaty and non-treaty power now sold to the US, is available at approximately $30/MWh, equivalent to Site C quantities. BC Hydro determined in the 2013 Integrated Resource Plan, DSM 5, that more than double the amount of power from Site C could be obtained from conservation at up to $45/MWh.

In 2017, Alberta received quotations for 600 MW of wind power at $37/MWh.

When BC Hydro buys power from independent power producers they set a price as low as $76.20 per megawatt hour for intermittent power from wind farms, and as high as $133.80 for firm hydro power. The average price paid, as of 2010, was $100 per megawatt hour. Site C is expected to cost $83 per megawatt hour for firm hydro power.

British Columbia has committed to reducing greenhouse gases to 33 per cent below 2007 levels by 2020; however, the province is far short of that goal, only achieving a 6.5% reduction as of 2015. Although the Site C dam is expected to have a large initial electricity surplus, the province has proposed to sell this power rather than choosing to reduce fossil fuel consumption in the province.

In 1983 the B.C. Utilities Commission recommended the province to explore geothermal as a potential alternative to Site C. As the Site C Joint Review Panel noted in its final report on the project, the province put virtually no effort into exploring alternatives.

See also
New hydro projects in Canada
List of generating stations in British Columbia

References

External links
 Site C Project website
 Site C Clean Energy Project at BC Hydro's web site
 Site C Clean Energy - Environmental Impact Statement
 Report of the BC/Canada joint review panel

Dams in British Columbia
Peace River Country
Dams on the Peace River
Dams under construction
Hydroelectric power stations in British Columbia
BC Hydro
Publicly owned dams in Canada